Keoratola crematorium or Keoratola Burning Ghat  or Shahnagar Keoratola crematorium is a crematory located at Tollygunge Road, Kalighat, Kolkata. This is one of the largest cremation grounds in Kolkata.

History
Before the establishment of this crematorium, there was a jungle of Caraway trees and the area was named as Keoratala. This crematorium was established in 1862 beside the bank of Adi Ganga. Keoratala crematorium was modernised by Dr. Bidhan Chandra Roy, Ex-Chief minister of West Bengal. There is a park besides it with number of tombs and memorials.

Notable funerals 

 Chittaranjan Das
 Jibanananda Das
 Charu Majumdar
 Satyajit Ray
 Shanu Lahiri
 Suchitra Sen
 Uttam Kumar
 Sunil Gangopadhyay
 Subhas Chakraborty
 Soumitra Chatterjee
 Subrata Mukherjee

See also 
 Nimtala crematorium
 Kashi Mitra Ghat crematorium

References 

Crematoria in India
Culture of Kolkata
Death in India